Bryan Court is a bungalow court located at 427 S. Marengo Ave. in Pasadena, California. The court includes seven Craftsman-style homes surrounding a central courtyard. The stucco houses are designed to resemble English cottages and have porches and jerkinhead roofs. D. M. Renton built the court in 1916.

The court was listed on the National Register of Historic Places in 1986.

See also
National Register of Historic Places listings in Pasadena, California

References

Bungalow courts
Bungalow architecture in California
Houses in Pasadena, California
Houses completed in 1916
Houses on the National Register of Historic Places in California
National Register of Historic Places in Pasadena, California